Full Coverage, Vol. 1 is an extended play (EP) by Trixie Mattel, released on April 30, 2021. The four-track collection includes cover versions of songs by Lana Del Rey, Violent Femmes, Cher, and Johnny Cash. Orville Peck is featured on the duet "Jackson".

Composition
The EP opens with a cover of Lana Del Rey's "Video Games". "Blister in the Sun" by American rock band Violent Femmes is the second track. The final two tracks are renditions of Cher's "Believe" and "Jackson", a collaboration featuring country singer Orville Peck.

Release and promotion
"Video Games" and "Blister in the Sun" had been issued as singles in September 2020 and February 2021 respectively prior to the release of the extended play, with both singles also receiving music videos. The EP was released on April 30, 2021 with a music video for the third single "Jackson" being released on the same day. Trixie Mattel had previewed "Jackson" on Instagram on April 19.

Critical reception
Tyler Maas of the Milwaukee Record said Trixie Mattel's version of "Video Games" is "excellent and true-to-album". He called "Blister in the Sun" a "rousing rendition" and said "Jackson" "bring[s] the EP home in grand fashion". Tony Madden of Traklife Music commented that "the original songs vary greatly in nearly every respect; each one hails from a different decade, genre and artist. But Mattel brings the tracks together as cohesively as ever with a smooth tenor voice and an array of acoustic instruments", calling the EP "a testament to her versatility".

Track listing

References

2021 EPs
Albums produced by Tomas Costanza
Covers EPs
Trixie Mattel albums